Tout doit disparaître or Everything Must Disappear is a 1997 French comedy film directed by Philippe Muyl.

Plot 
Robert Millard has based his industrial kingdom - based on all the noise technologies - thanks to his marriage with the wealthy and cantankerous Irene, he blithely cheat for years. However, his last link with his pretty secretary, Eve, is the straw that broke the camel : Irene has indeed hired a detective-photographer, aptly named M.Colle order to have a maximum of incriminating shots. Threatened to divorce and thus to total ruin by his wife, the unfaithful husband should give up and dismiss Eve.

Decided not to let themselves dictated by his wife and too cowardly to leave his fortune, CEO at random for an air trip, he meets Gérard Piche, novelist police station, specializing in the perfect crime. Millard then contracts with the naive writer so that he write his new novel, a new murder without evidence overwhelming, one last perfect crime ... Robert has followed carefully to remove the cumbersome Irene. But nothing will really unfold as planned ... all under the objective of tenacious M.Colle.

Cast 

 Didier Bourdon as Robert Millard
 Yolande Moreau as Irene Millard
 Élie Semoun as Gerard Piche
 Ophélie Winter as Eve Latour
 José Garcia as Detective Colle
 Régis Laspalès as The hypnotist
 Andrée Damant as Annie
 Luc Palun as Bernard
 Didier Bénureau as The notary
 Paule Daré as The new secretary
 Marie Borowski as The fat lady
 Peter King as The loud man

References

External links 

1997 films
French comedy films
1997 comedy films
1990s French films